Eliana Maria Nagib Aleixo (born 13 July 1954) is a Brazilian former volleyball player. She competed in the women's tournament at the 1980 Summer Olympics.

References

External links
 

1954 births
Living people
Brazilian women's volleyball players
Olympic volleyball players of Brazil
Volleyball players at the 1980 Summer Olympics
Sportspeople from Belo Horizonte
Pan American Games medalists in volleyball
Pan American Games bronze medalists for Brazil
Medalists at the 1979 Pan American Games
20th-century Brazilian women